God's Acre is a churchyard, specifically the burial ground.  The word comes from the German Gottesacker (Field of God), an ancient designation for a burial ground.  The use of "Acre" is related to, but not derived from the unit of measurement and can be of any size.  In the early 17th century the term was used as a translation of the German, but by the end of the century it was accepted as an English term.

American Congregationalist poet Henry Wadsworth Longfellow wrote an 1842 poem called "God's Acre" that referenced this term.

While used to refer to graveyards generally in English, the term is used particularly among communicants of the Moravian Church in parts of North America (but not in the Moravian independent provinces of Alaska and Labrador/Newfoundland).

In Christianity

In England prior to the 19th century most parish churches were surrounded by a burial ground.  Particularly in the 19th century the churchyard was referred to by a number of gentle, less stark terms, including "God's Acre".  The term is less used today but is still employed when drawing attention to the field-like quality rather than the disposal function.  For example, the God's Acre Project is a national (UK) project which "recognises churchyards and cemeteries as significant areas for flora, fauna and social history and seeks to provide advice and guidance for their management".

Moravians

It has become the traditional name given to the graveyards of Congregations of the Moravian Church. The first Moravian God's Acre was begun in 1730 on the western slope of the Hutberg (“Hill of Watching”) at Herrnhut Saxony in Germany, the Moravian Mother Congregation. As the Moravian Church spread around the world, they laid out their graveyards on hilltops, also calling them Hutberg and naming the graveyard God's Acre. The name comes from the belief that the bodies of the dead are "sown as seed" in God's Acre, as in a field, so that they can rise again when Jesus Christ returns to the world. God's Acre is not literally one acre in size; many are larger or smaller.

Moravians believe strongly in equality, even in death; therefore, every stone in a God's Acre is a recumbent stone of the same material with the same proportions so that no one person stands out among the stones. The Communion of Saints is continued even on the graveyard as it reflects the continuity of the congregation. In addition, the deceased are buried by choir; to the Moravians, these were the living groups into which the Congregation was originally divided to meet the needs of the members according to their age and station in life. Originally, men and women sat in their choir groups in church at worship. The burial by choir in God's Acre also reflects the way the members of the congregation sat as a worshipping community so that visually and symbolically the Congregation continues in the graveyard.

Along with being separated by gender, there are also sections for people of different ages and marital statuses. The typical configuration has sections for infant girls and infant boys, girls and boys, single men and single women, and married men and married women. The deceased are buried in their respective section in the order they have died. Smaller God's Acres may combine the infant and children sections. Some larger God's Acres, such as the one for the Salem Congregation in Winston-Salem, North Carolina, may also have separate sections for those who are cremated, as their remains take up less space than those who are buried with their bodies intact.

In addition to the God's Acre on the Hutberg in Herrnhut and the God's Acre of Salem Congregation in Winston-Salem, N.C. there are striking God's Acres in almost every Moravian Congregation, including in Chelsea Moravian Burial Ground (part of London) in the United Kingdom, Bethlehem and Nazareth, Pennsylvania, Bethania in North Carolina and Koenigsfeld in the Black Forest of Germany. Many God's Acres also feature arched entrance gates inscribed with an appropriate Bible verse along the top; if there is more than one entrance, each gate will usually have a verse above it.

There is also the Good Friday tradition of cleaning gravestones in Moravian cemeteries. The week before Easter, families and church groups clean the uniform gravestones and decorate them with flowers, transforming the God's Acre into an almost-garden like place.   

Many Moravian churches have a custom of holding an Easter sunrise service, or Resurrection Service in a God's Acre, the "Church Militant" gathering together amid the graves of the "Church Triumphant" before the Risen Christ. The opening words of the Resurrection Service, "The Lord is risen!/The Lord is risen indeed!" date from the first such Moravian-style service in Herrnhut, Germany in 1732. The liturgy for the service is a Confession of Faith drawn up by Nicolaus Ludwig, Count von Zinzendorf (1700–1760) patron and leader of the Renewed Unitas Fratrum. It is based on Martin Luther's Small Catechism.

Blackville, South Carolina
God's Acre also refers to a small patch of land whose legal owner is "God Almighty". The land includes a natural spring whose water local tradition holds has healing powers. Located near Blackville, South Carolina, the land was owned by L. P. "Lute" Boylston until 1944 when he died. In his will, Boylston gave the land to "God Almighty" to ensure that the water from its spring would always be free for anyone to drink.  Coordinates:   The Springs are listed as part of the South Carolina National Heritage Corridor. There is also a nearby historical marker on SC 3.

New Canaan, Connecticut
A section of town in New Canaan, Connecticut, where there are three large, white churches side by side, is referred to locally as "God's Acre", although the area is actually less than an acre and the name came about because the area was once a cemetery.

References 

Traditions of the Moravian Church